Ettore Badolato (born 28 June 1964) is an Italian former racing cyclist. He rode in the 1989 Tour de France.

References

External links
 

1964 births
Living people
Italian male cyclists
People from Vimercate
Cyclists from the Province of Monza e Brianza
20th-century Italian people